Agoonoree is a Scouting jamboree for young people with disabilities.

History
In 1949, Netherlands Scouts organised an international camp at Lunteren for Scouts with disabilities called "Agoon", after the Greek language word agṓn (ἀγών) meaning a gathering or competition. Further international Agoon camps were held in Belgium in 1953 and at Gilwell Park in the United Kingdom in 1958. The success of these events prompted the establishment of "Agoonoree" (a compound word of Agoon plus jamboree) camps at national or regional level in several countries.

Australia 
The first Queensland Agoonoree was held in 1980, following a visit by leaders to the 3rd Nippon Agoonoree in the previous year. Each year Scouts Queensland and Guides Queensland invite about 70 children as guests to participate in a week long camp at Baden-Powell Park, Samford, Queensland.  Scouts New South Wales also holds an Agoonoree; in 2015 it was held at Mount Keira Scout Activity Centre. Scouts Victoria held their third Agoonoree in 2018 at Treetops Scout Camp, Riddells Creek.

Indonesia

A National Special Scout Jamboree is held every five years for disabled Scouts. The seventh National Special Scouts Jamboree was held in 2007, in East Jakarta. The first jamboree of this sort to be held in Indonesia was in 1972.

Japan 
Nippon Agoonorees are held once every four years, and are abbreviated "NA", and may include the number of the event. For example, "9NA" refers to the 9th Nippon Agoonoree. SAJ (Scout Association of Japan) uploads these pictures in Facebook. Fumihito, Prince Akishino and Princess Mako participated in the Agoonoree on August 12, 2016.

 1st Nippon Agoonoree: August 8 to August 20, 1973 Aichi Youth Park, Aichi Prefecture
 2nd Nippon Agoonoree: July 30 to August 3, 1976 Aichi Youth Park, Aichi Prefecture
 3rd Nippon Agoonoree: August 3 to August 8, 1979 Nagai Park, Osaka
 4th Nippon Agoonoree: August 5 to August 9, 1983 Ureshinodai Lifelong Educational Center, Hyōgo Prefecture
 5th Nippon Agoonoree: July 31 to August 4, 1987 Chuo Youth House, Gotenba, Shizuoka Prefecture
 6th Nippon Agoonoree: July 25 to August 29, 1991 National Institution for Youth Education, Tokyo
 7th Nippon Agoonoree: July 26 to July 30, 1995 National Myogo Youth Outdoor Learning Center, Niigata Prefecture
 8th Nippon Agoonoree: August 5 to August 9, 1999 Outdoor Activity Center, Matsuyama, Ehime Prefecture
 9th Nippon Agoonoree: July 31 to August 4, 2003 Refresh Town Hachi-ga-saki, Suzu, Ishikawa Prefecture
 10th Nippon Agoonoree: July 31 to August 4, 2008 (It would have been held in 2007, but was moved to 2008 due to the World Scout Jamboree being held in 2007.) Happy Village, Kobe, Hyogo Prefecture
 11th Nippon Agoonoree: August 2 to August 6, 2012 Kibogaoka Culture Park, Shiga Prefecture
 12th Nippon Agoonoree: August 12 to August 16, 2016 Fuji Yamanomura, Fujimiya, Shizuoka Prefecture
 13th Nippon Agoonoree: August, 2020 Fukushima Prefecture

United Kingdom
The first camp for Extension Scouts of the London region was held in 1947. In the 1960s, the London Agoonoree consisted of between 60 and 80 Scouts with special needs accompanied by able-bodied Scouts who acted as helpers as well as adult Scouters. Later in the decade, the camp split into two, the northern Scout Counties of London forming "North Camp" and the Southern and Central being "South Camp". The annual London Agoonoree currently caters for members of The Scout Association with special needs in the 14-23 age group. The first Yorkshire Agoonoree was held in 1960.

See also
Extension Scouting
World Jamboree

References

Scouting jamborees
Summer camps for children with special needs